Terminal City may refer to:
 A nickname for the city of Vancouver, British Columbia
 Terminal City (Manhattan), a development around Grand Central Terminal in New York City
Terminal City (comics), two comic book limited series published by DC Comics under their Vertigo imprint 
 Terminal City (magazine), a magazine distributed in the Vancouver area until October 2005
 Terminal City (TV series), a 2005 Canadian mini-series
 a novel by Linda Fairstein
 Terminal City Rollergirls, a Vancouver roller derby league